Maritim Jolie Ville Resort is a resort hotel and golf course in Naama Bay, Sharm El Sheikh.  It is run by the HKS Group, chaired by Hussein Salem.
The rooms of the hotel are described as being "shady bungalows". It reportedly has a   'lazy river' water park and lush gardens.

References

Hotels in Egypt
Sharm El Sheikh
Hotel buildings completed in 1991
Hotels established in 1991